Uiles Geraldo Gonçalves de Freitas Júnior, (born 28 February 1965), known as Mazola Júnior, is a Brazilian professional football manager and former player who played as a forward.

Career
Since 2009 he coached the Ituano in when ran the Série D and the Campeonato Paulista. learner categories of junior in Sport, has assumed interim team principal with the resignations of Geninho and PC Gusmão. assuming definitely the job for the last five games in the Série B, where led the team back to the first division 2012. remained in the club during the Campeonato Pernambucano, where were victorious vice-champion.

Then assumed the command of Ipatinga, Bragantino, Cuiabá, Paysandu. returned to the command of Bragantino and Paysandu. being that the bicolor led him back to Série B and winning the vice championship Série C 2014. In March 2015, hit with the Botafogo de Ribeirão Preto, where the led the final stages of the Paulistão 2015, dropping after sort the team.

In May 2018, he was appointed coach of Criciúma.

Honours
Sport Recife
 Campeonato Pernambucano U-20: 2011

CRB
 Campeonato Alagoano: 2016

Ituano
Campeonato Brasileiro Série C: 2021

References

External links
 
 
 Profile at Grande Área

1965 births
Living people
Sportspeople from Campinas
Brazilian footballers
Brazilian football managers
Association football forwards
Primeira Liga players
Segunda Divisão players
Clube Náutico Marcílio Dias players
Rio Branco Esporte Clube players
Portimonense S.C. players
A.D. Sanjoanense players
Campeonato Brasileiro Série B managers
Campeonato Brasileiro Série C managers
Ituano FC managers
Sport Club do Recife managers
Ipatinga Futebol Clube managers
Clube Atlético Bragantino managers
Cuiabá Esporte Clube managers
Paysandu Sport Club managers
Botafogo Futebol Clube (SP) managers
Clube de Regatas Brasil managers
Vila Nova Futebol Clube managers
Criciúma Esporte Clube managers
Londrina Esporte Clube managers
Clube do Remo managers
Esporte Clube Vitória managers
Grêmio Novorizontino managers
Associação Portuguesa de Desportos managers
Brazilian expatriate footballers
Brazilian expatriate football managers
Brazilian expatriate sportspeople in Portugal
Expatriate footballers in Portugal
Expatriate football managers in Portugal